The Ganja language may be:

Balanta-Ganja language
Kandawo language